Nootka may refer to:

  Nuu-chah-nulth or Nootka, an indigenous people in Canada's Pacific Northwest
  Nuu-chah-nulth language or Nootka, spoken by the above

Places in British Columbia, Canada
 Nootka Sound
 Nootka Island
 Nootka Fault

Plants
 Puccinellia nutkaensis, a grass species also called Nootka alkaligrass
 Cupressus nootkatensis, a tree species also known as Nootka cypress
 Rosa nutkana, a perennial shrub also called Nootka rose
 Lupinus nootkatensis, a perennial plant also known as Nootka lupine

Other uses
 HMCS Nootka (J35), a Royal Canadian Navy Second World War minesweeper
 HMCS Nootka (R96), a Royal Canadian Navy destroyer
 Nootka Jargon, a Nootka (Nuu-chah-nulth) pidgin used as a trade language along the Pacific Northwest coast
 Nootka Elementary School, in Vancouver, British Columbia

See also
 Nootka Crisis, an 18th century dispute involving the Nuu-chah-nulth Nation, the Spanish Empire, the Kingdom of Great Britain and the fledgling United States of America
 Nootka Conventions, three treaties signed in the 1790s between Spain and Great Britain, defusing the Nootka Crisis